Křenice may refer to the following places in the Czech Republic:

 Křenice (Klatovy District), a village in Plzeň Region
 Křenice (Prague-East District), a village in Central Bohemian Region